Nam Il (5 June 1915 – 7 March 1976) was a Russian-born North Korean military officer and co-signer of the Korean Armistice Agreement.

Biography
Nam was born Yakov Petrovich Nam likely in the Russian Far East. Due to a Soviet policy, Nam's family, like many Koreans in Russia's Far East, were moved to Central Asia. He was educated at Smolensk Military School and in Tashkent. Nam achieved his final rank of captain as an Assistant to ta Division Chief of Staff of a Soviet Army division during World War II. He took part in some of the greatest battles, including Stalingrad and the Battle of Berlin.

When not serving in the military, he worked in the education sector. In 1946, he was sent to Soviet occupied North Korea, as a member of a contingent of ethnic Korean former Soviet military officers to assist Kim Il-sung, leaving behind a wife and daughter in Soviet Union. After war broke out in 1950 he was appointed Chief of Staff, replacing Kang Kon who had been killed in action. In 1953, Nam became a General of the Army (대장, three-star rank at the time). When the Korean War reached a stalemate in July 1951, Nam served as the Communists' chief delegate at the armistice talks. He was famous for using an amber cigarette holder.

After the war, Nam Il served as Minister of Foreign Affairs. Along with another Soviet Korean Pak Chong-ae, he worked to help Kim Il-sung break free from Soviet influence. In 1957, he was promoted and became one of several deputy Prime Ministers. Nam, along with Pang Hak-se (the founder of the DPRK secret police), was one of only a few prominent Soviet Koreans who survived the purges of the 1950s.

On 7 March 1976, it was announced that he had died when his car was crushed by a truck. Many suspected that this was not an accident, and some blamed Kim Jong-il, who by that time was not powerful enough to simply order Nam be killed. Others said that it was done by Kim Il-sung. Nam Il's son, who lived in the Soviet Union, visited North Korea and attempted to investigate, but Pang Hak-se told him to go home and stop interfering in affairs which did not concern him.

Nam was awarded a state funeral and was buried in Revolutionary Martyrs' Cemetery. Unlike some of his colleagues who were purged, Nam continues to appear in historical photographs.

Awards
 Order of Polonia Restituta, 2nd Class

Citations

References

 Futrell, Robert F. (1961).The United States Air Force in Korea 1950-1953. Air Force History and Museums Program year 2000 reprint of original Duel, Sloan and Pearce edition. ISBNs 0160488796, 978–0160488795.

External links

|-

|-

North Korean generals
North Korean military personnel of the Korean War
Foreign ministers of North Korea
North Korean atheists
North Korean communists
1915 births
1976 deaths
People from North Hamgyong
Road incident deaths in North Korea
Soviet people of Korean descent
Soviet military personnel of World War II
Members of the 1st Supreme People's Assembly
Members of the 2nd Supreme People's Assembly
Members of the 3rd Supreme People's Assembly
Members of the 4th Supreme People's Assembly
Members of the 5th Supreme People's Assembly
Commanders with Star of the Order of Polonia Restituta